Inquilinos is a 2018 Mexican horror film directed by Chava Cartas, from a screenplay by Juan Carlos Garzón and Angélica Gudiño. The plot revolves around Luzma (Danny Perea) and Demián (Erick Elías), a young couple, who have just moved to an old neighborhood to leave behind an incident that torments them. However, Luzma begins to discover that her neighbors hide terrible secrets that lead to paranormal phenomena. The film is based on real events and was filmed in Guadalajara, Mexico.

Cast 
 Danny Perea as Luzma
 Erick Elías as Demián
 Fernando Ciangherotti as Sacerdote
 Dagoberto Gama as Antonio
 Noé Hernández as Marcelino
 Gabriela Roel as Irma
 Camila Selser as Judith
 Evangelina Martínez as Socorro
 Alberto Guerra
 Luis Arrieta
 Zuria Vega

References

External links 
 

Mexican supernatural horror films
2010s Mexican films